Sir Christopher Anthony Hohn KCMG (born October 1966) is a British billionaire hedge fund manager.

In 2003, Hohn established The Children's Investment Fund Management (TCI), a prominent value-based hedge fund. Profits generated by the fund were initially proportionately allocated to The Children's Investment Fund Foundation, a registered charity in England and Wales that focuses on improving the lives of children living in poverty in developing countries. He is known as an activist investor.

As of 2014, he had given over $4.5 billion to The Children's Investment Fund Foundation. Hohn is worth $5 billion according to the Forbes billionaires list in 2020, an increase of $1.9 billion from 2019. In 2019, Forbes put Hohn in the list of the world's most generous philanthropists outside of the US. In recent years, Hohn has become an outspoken advocate of urgent action on the climate crisis, and a prolific contributor to the cause.

Early life
Christopher Anthony Hohn was born in October 1966 in Addlestone, Surrey. His father Paul was a Jamaican-born car mechanic of European descent who moved to Britain in 1960, and his mother was a legal secretary from East Sussex.

He was a pupil at St Paul's County Secondary School in Addlestone between 1979 and 1983 gaining 13 O Levels; he then attended the University of Southampton from which he graduated in 1988 with first-class honours in accounting and business economics. While at Southampton, a tutor advised him to apply for Harvard Business School, where he completed the Master of Business Administration course. He graduated in 1993 as a Baker Scholar, meaning he was among the top five percent of all graduates.

Career
After graduating, Hohn worked for the private equity group Apax Partners. In 1996 he went to work for Perry Capital, a hedge fund on Wall Street. In 1998 he was made head of Perry's London operations. In his time with Perry, he earned an estimated £75m.

In 2003, Hohn set up his own hedge fund, The Children's Investment Fund.  TCI donated regularly to a connected charitable fund, The Children's Investment Fund Foundation, run by his wife.  The original formula involved transfers of 0.5 percent of the fund's assets each year, with a further 0.5 per cent of assets for every year during which the fund achieved returns of more than 11 per cent. It is reported that Hohn established the formulaic charitable link in order to motivate himself. Coinciding with the couple's divorce proceedings, changes set in motion in 2012 led to the splitting up of the fund and the foundation. The fund no longer donates money to the foundation on a contractual basis, though it may do so on a discretionary basis.

Hohn took £200m in dividend payments in 2018, slightly more than his Children's Investment (TCI) fund made in profit. This was down from $274m in 2017 and $364m in 2016. His 2015 earnings of $250 million ranked him 12th among the 25 top earning hedge fund managers.

In 2019, it was reported that he had built a €730m stake in Heathrow Airport via a range of investment companies jointly taking a 4% stake in Spanish multinational Ferrovial.

From March 2019 to March 2020 he paid himself $479 million, the highest annual amount paid to a person in the UK.

In conjunction with The Children's Investment (TCI) fund Hohn launched the "Say on climate" initiative. The idea of the campaign is to make companies disclose their greenhouse gas emissions and their plans to manage these emissions and also give shareholders an advisory vote on the plans and their results. The initiative was first implemented by Aena, Unilever, Glencore, and CN but it has won many critics at the same time.

Investor activism 
In November 2022, Chris Hohn on behalf of TCI wrote an open letter to Sundar Pichai, CEO of Alphabet and Google. In the letter, Hohn stated that Google's headcount was too high and should be reduced. He also stated that there should be more effort to reduce losses in its self-driving unit Waymo. On January 20, 2023, Alphabet cut 12,000 Jobs which was 6% of its workforce. On the same day, Hohn issued another letter to Pichai stating that there should further job cuts with a target of 20%. The letter also states that management should address excessive employee compensation.

Donations
In 2019 it was reported by The Daily Telegraph that Hohn had donated £50,000 to environmental activist group Extinction Rebellion, with a further £150,000 donated by the Children's Investment Fund Foundation. None of the Charity's money was spent on civil disobedience, it was claimed. As of January 2022, Hohn was the single biggest individual donor to Extinction Rebellion.

In April 2020, he made a £2.4 million donation to purchase around 100 SAMBA II machines to test for COVID-19.

Honours
Hohn was appointed Knight Commander of the Order of St Michael and St George (KCMG) in the 2014 Birthday Honours for services to philanthropy and international development.

Personal life
He married Jamie Cooper, a fellow Harvard graduate student from Chicago, whom he had met at a party during his studies. Upon marriage, they took each other's surnames to become Cooper-Hohn, although he is still widely known as Hohn. The couple went on to have four children, including triplets.

In 2013 it was reported that Hohn had begun divorce proceedings with his wife. In November 2014, he was set to pay his American-born ex-wife $500 million, in what was thought to be the biggest divorce settlement ever awarded by an English court. In December 2014, he was ordered to pay his ex-wife £337 million.

Hohn practices yoga and does not eat meat.

He is married to Kylie Hohn (nee Richardson), who has a PhD from Harvard University and has taught at Harvard and the University of Cambridge. She is the CEO of LightEn, an organisation of which they are the co-founders.

References

1966 births
Alumni of the University of Southampton
British hedge fund managers
English financial businesspeople
English philanthropists
English billionaires
Giving Pledgers
21st-century philanthropists
Harvard Business School alumni
Living people
People from Addlestone
English people of Jamaican descent
Knights Commander of the Order of St Michael and St George
Conservative Party (UK) donors